Camphuysen is a Dutch surname and the name of a 17th-century family of painters:

Dirk Rafaelsz Camphuysen (1586–1627), Dutch painter, poet and theologian
Govert Dircksz Camphuysen (1624–1672), Dutch animal painter, son of Dirk
Joachim Govertsz Camphuysen (1601–1659), Dutch landscape painter, brother of Rafaël, nephew of Dirk
Rafaël Govertsz Camphuysen  (1597–1657), Dutch landscape painter, brother of Joachim, nephew of Dirk

See also
Jan Kamphuijsen (1760–1841), Dutch painter
Kamphuis, Dutch surname

Dutch-language surnames